The Robinson Prize is one of two awards given out by ACES: The Society for Editing annually to one copy editor whose work demonstrates exceptional effectiveness.

History
Established in 2005, the prize is named for Pam Robinson, formerly a news editor at the Los Angeles Times-Washington Post News Service in suburban New York. Robinson was the co-founder of ACES in 1997 and the society's first president.

Evaluation
Nominees are evaluated on a combination of elements, which include editing, design, mentoring and training, fostering a sense of teamwork and pride among colleagues, and anything else that furthers the role of the editing profession. Says Teresa Schmedding, one of the drafters of the award, and a member of the Society's Executive Committee, This award isn't designed to applaud the best speller in the newsroom or the best grammarian. Being a good wordsmith isn't enough. Today's copy editors need to be skilled in conflict resolution, show excellent news judgment, demonstrate initiative and be able to find creative solutions to help their papers succeed in this era filled with increased competition.

Eligibility
The contest is open to all copy editors working for English-language news publications, though work considered for nomination must be current. Members of the Society's Executive Committee, employees, and the administrators of the contest are ineligible.

Winners
Winners of the Prize, in addition to recognition, receive $3,000.
2005: Paul Soucy, USA Today
2006: Tim Lynch, Los Angeles Times
2007: Adam Smith, The Augusta Chronicle
2008: Michael Roehrman, The Wichita Eagle
2009: Beth Blair, Boy Scouts of America
2010: Andy Angelo, The Grand Rapids (Mich.) Press
2011: Kim Profant, Chicago Tribune
2012: Doris Truong, Washington Post
2013: Katharine O'Moore-Klopf,  medical editor for ACES, American Medical Writers Association, Board of Editors in the Life Sciences, Editorial Freelancers Association etc.; Copyeditors Knowledge Base online
2014: Larissa Newton, Central Penn Business Journal
2015: Sarah Grey, Grey Editing
2016 Karen Yin, Conscious Style Guide
2017 Karen S. Conlin
2018 Rob Reinalda
2019 Laura Poole, Archer Editorial Services
2022 Talysa Sainz

References

Copy editing
American journalism awards